Petushinsky District is an administrative and municipal district (raion), one of the sixteen in Vladimir Oblast, Russia. It is located in the southwest of the oblast. Its administrative center is the town of Petushki. Population:   69,364 (2002 Census);  The population of Petushki accounts for 22.3% of the district's total population.

References

Notes

Sources

Districts of Vladimir Oblast